Four gymnastics events for men were contested at the 1912 Summer Olympics in Stockholm, Sweden. No women's competitions were held, though women did participate in non-competitive gymnastic displays. Including the displays, the events were held between 6 and 15 July 1912. All events took place in the Olympiastadion.

Amateur definitions

The definition for the gymnastic competitions was:

An amateur is one:

 who has never, for pecuniary gain, taken part in a public competition or display;
 who has never taken part in a competition for money prizes;
 who, in all other respects, is an amateur according to the rules of his own country.

Gymnastic teachers and leaders, even though they receive payment as such, are regarded as amateurs.

Medal summary

Participating nations

A total of 249 gymnasts from 12 nations competed at the Stockholm Games:

Medal table

References

External links
 International Olympic Committee medal database

 
1912 Summer Olympics events
1912
1912 in gymnastics